Brian James Morris (born 14 July 1950) is a professor emeritus of molecular medical sciences at the University of Sydney, Australia.

Education and appointments
Brian Morris grew up in Adelaide, South Australia, where he graduated from the University of Adelaide in 1972. He then completed his PhD at Monash University and the University of Melbourne in 1975. From 1975–1978 he did postdoctoral research at the University of Missouri, and the University of California, San Francisco, first as a CJ Martin fellow, and then as an Advanced Fellow of the American Heart Association. He was then appointed as an academic at the University of Sydney in 1978, was appointed a professor in 1999, and was appointed Professor Emeritus in 2013. He retired in 2014 and the Bosch Institute of Medical Research took over his lab space.

Career
Morris studied the Renin–angiotensin system (RAS) for most of his career.  His interest in RAS began during his undergraduate studies, when he worked for a while in the laboratory where Eugenie Lumbers had just found early clues to the existence of prorenin (the protein precursor of renin) during her PhD work. He remained interested in the field, and had the good fortune to move to the University of California, San Francisco in the mid-1970s, a center for the development of the tools of biotechnology and molecular cloning.  He joined others in applying those tools to RAS, and was among the pioneers is isolating the gene for renin itself, along with the prorenin and kallikrein genes, and the cardiac myosin heavy chain gene.

He and his team were among first to elucidate the biosynthetic pathway of renin, as well as key molecular mechanisms in renin's transcriptional and posttranscriptional control. Taking that work further, he helped pioneer the field of genetic variation in hypertension.

Morris has been active in the public debate around circumcision. He has described medical organisations, such as the Royal Australasian College of Surgeons, who are not in favour of routine non-therapeutic circumcision, as like anti-vaccine advocates. He has, however, also remarked that parents should "weigh up all of the pros and cons for themselves and make their own best decision".

In the 2000s, he began to study the genetics of longevity, including the roles of FOXO3 and the sirtuins.

Awards and honours
He was awarded the Royal Society of New South Wales' Edgeworth David Medal in 1985 and in 1993 the University of Sydney awarded him a DSc. In 2003 he was elected as an Honorary Fellow of the American Heart Association Council for High Blood Pressure Research. In 2010 he gave the Lewis K. Dahl Memorial lecture, an award sponsored by the Council for High Blood Pressure Research in association with the American Heart Association.  In 2014 the AHA awarded him the Irvine Page—Alva Bradley Lifetime Achievement Award. He was made a Member of the Order of Australia in the Queens Birthday Honours Awards in 2018.

References

External links
 CircInfo.net Morris' website on circumcision

1950 births
Australian biologists
Circumcision debate
Living people
Monash University alumni
Members of the Order of Australia
University of Adelaide alumni
University of Melbourne alumni
University of Missouri staff
Academic staff of the University of Sydney